Artur Kaplur (1894 – 13 February 1953 Paide) was an Estonian politician. He was a member of Estonian Constituent Assembly, representing the Estonian Social Democratic Workers' Party.

References

1894 births
1953 deaths
Estonian Social Democratic Workers' Party politicians
Members of the Estonian Constituent Assembly